Dr Thomas Ifor Rees CMG (16 February 1890 – 11 February 1977) was a British diplomat, author and translator. Born Thomas Ifor Rees at 'Bronceiro' near the hamlet of Rhydypennau in Cardiganshire, Wales, he served as Britain's first Ambassador to Bolivia from 1947 until his retirement in 1949.

He was the author of a number of travel books in Welsh and English, such as In and around the valley of Mexico (1953), Sajama (1960) and Illimani (1964). His translations include a Welsh translation of the Rubaiyat of Omar Khayyam, published in Mexico City in 1939.

References

External links
Welsh Biography Online

1890 births
1977 deaths
People from Ceredigion
People educated at Ardwyn School, Aberystwyth
20th-century Welsh writers
Welsh-language writers
Welsh diplomats
Translators of Omar Khayyám
Ambassadors of the United Kingdom to Bolivia
20th-century translators